Shawn is a masculine given name, an anglicized spelling of the Irish name Seán. Alternate spellings include Shawne, Shaun and Sean. It is sometimes used as a feminine given name. Notable people with the name include:

People

Given name: Shawn
Shawn Abner (born 1966), American Major League Baseball player
Shawn Ashmore (born 1979), Canadian actor
Shawn Bradley (born 1972), American National Basketball Association player
Shawn Corey Carter (born 1969), American rapper and businessman better known as Jay-Z
Shawn Colvin (born 1956), American singer and songwriter
Shawn Christensen, American screenwriter, film director, singer, songwriter and actor
Shawn Daniels (born 1979), American basketball player
Shawn Daniels (Canadian football) (born 1966), Canadian Football League player
Shawn Davis (American football) (born 1997), American football player
Shawn Dou (born 1988), Chinese actor
Shawn Doyle (born 1968), Canadian actor
Shawn Estes (born 1973), American Major League Baseball pitcher
Shawn Fanning (born 1980), American computer programmer, entrepreneur and angel investor
Shawn Farquhar (born 1962), Canadian magician and illusionist
Shawn Faulkner (born 1962), American football player
Shawn Graham (born 1968), Canadian politician
Shawn Grate (born 1976), American serial killer
Shawn Green (born 1972), American Major League Baseball All Star player
Shawn James (born 1983), Guyanese-American basketball player
Shawn Johnson East (born 1992), American gymnast
Shawn Jones (gridiron football) (born 1970), American football player
Shawn Jones (basketball) (born 1992), American basketball player
Shawn Jones (musician) (born 1976), American singer and songwriter
Shawn Kemp (born 1969), American National Basketball Association player
Shawn King, American National Football League player
Shawn King (basketball), Vincentian basketball player
Shawn Lee (actor) (born 1990), actor from Singapore
Shawn Lee (American football) (1966–2011), American National Football League player
Shawn Lee (musician) (born 1963), American multi-instrumentalist, producer and composer
Shawn Levy (born 1968), Canadian film director, producer and actor
Shawn Marion (born 1978), American National Basketball Association player
Shawn Mendes (born 1998), Canadian singer and songwriter
Shawn Mullins (born 1968), American singer and songwriter
Shawn Nelson (American football) (born 1985), American National Football League player
Shawn Nelson (criminal) (1959–1995), American plumber who stole a tank and went on a rampage
Shawn Phillips (born 1943), American folk rock musician
Shawn Porter (born 1987), American boxer, former IBF welterweight champion
Shawn Redhage (born 1981), American-Australian basketball player
Shawn Ryan (born 1966), American screenwriter and television producer
Shawn Stockman (born 1972), American singer, songwriter and record producer, a member of the vocal group Boyz II Men
Shawn Thornton (born 1973), Canadian National Hockey League player
Shawn Tok (born 1994), Singaporean actor and singer
Shawn Wayans (born 1971), American actor, DJ, producer, writer and comedian
Shawn Weatherly (born 1959), American actress and beauty queen, Miss USA and Miss Universe in 1980
Shawn Yue (born 1981), Hong Kong actor and singer

Given name: Shawne 

 Shawne Duperon, American television producer
 Shawne Fielding, American-Swiss actress and model
 Shawne Kleckner, American businessman
 Shawne Major, American mixed media artist
 Shawne Merriman, American football player
 Shawne Williams, American basketball player

Stage or ring name
 Shawn Daivari, ring name of American professional wrestler Dara Shawn Daivari (born 1984)
 Shawn Desman, stage name of Canadian hip hop singer, songwriter, dancer and producer Shawn Fernandes (born 1982)
 Shawn Hook, stage name of Canadian singer, songwriter and producer Shawn Hlookoff (born 1984)
 Shawn Michaels, ring name of American professional wrestler Michael Shawn Hickenbottom (born 1965)
 Shawn Pen, stage name of American hip hop artist, rapper, songwriter and producer Tyrone Shawn Wilkins (born 1969/70)
 Shawn Stasiak, ring name of American professional wrestler Shawn Stipich (born 1970)

Fictional characters
 Shawn Hunter, on the TV series Boy Meets World and Girl Meets World
 Shawn Spencer, main protagonist of the TV series Psych
 Shawn, from Total Drama: Pahkitew Island
 Shawn, from Barney & Friends
 Shawn, main antagonist of the TV series The Good Place

See also
 Shawn (surname)
 Shaun, includes a list of people with given name Shaun
 Shon (given name), includes a list of people named Shon
 List of people named Sean
 Rashawn, given name

Masculine given names
English-language masculine given names
English masculine given names
English unisex given names
Lists of people by given name